Maybe Not Tonight is the sixth studio album that was released by American country music artist Sammy Kershaw. It was released in 1999 (see 1999 in country music) on Mercury Records. The first album of his career not to achieve an RIAA certification, it also failed to produce any Top Ten country hits. The lead-off single, which was the title track duet with Lorrie Morgan (also included on her 1999 album My Heart) reached #17 on the country charts. This song was concurrently promoted by Mercury and BNA Records, Morgan's label. Following it were "When You Love Someone" at #37 and "Me and Maxine" at #35. "Louisiana Hot Sauce", the fourth and final track, failed to chart. Also included is a cover of Bobby Vee's "More Than I Can Say", which water later a #2 pop hit for Leo Sayer in 1980. In addition, "How Much Does the World Weigh" was later recorded by Tracy Byrd on his 2001 album Ten Rounds. Maybe Not Tonight was also Kershaw's last studio album for Mercury. After it was released, Mercury issued an album of cover songs and a second greatest hits compilation before he exited the label.

Track listing

Personnel
Eddie Bayers – drums
Stuart Duncan – fiddle
Paul Franklin – steel guitar
John Kelton – keyboards
Sammy Kershaw – lead vocals
Brent Mason – electric guitar
Lorrie Morgan – vocals on "Maybe Not Tonight"
Gary Prim – keyboards
Hargus "Pig" Robbins – piano
John Wesley Ryles – background vocals
Keith Stegall – "wangy guitar"
John D. Willis – acoustic guitar
Glenn Worf – bass guitar

String section
Bruce Dukov, Endre Granat, Bob Gerry, Alan Grunfeld, Clayton Haslop, Darius Campo, Gil Romero, Horia Moroaica, Joel Derouin, Karen Johnes, Mike Markman, Pat Johnson, Rachel Purkin, Razdan Kuyumjian, Sheldon Sanov, Tammy Hatwan – violins
Harry Shirinian, Margot Aldcroft, Matt Funes, Carrie Holzman, Maria Newman, Simon Oswell, Ron Strauss, Ray Tischer – violas
Steve Erody, Vage Ayrikyan, Jodi Burnett, Larry Corbett, Suzie Katayama, Armen Ksajikian, Miguel Martinez, Steve Richards – cellos

Strings conducted and arranged by Steve Dorff.

Chart performance

Weekly charts

Year-end charts

References

Allmusic (see infobox)

1999 albums
Sammy Kershaw albums
Mercury Nashville albums
Albums produced by Keith Stegall